Bertram Marburgh (1875–1956) was an American stage and film actor.  He appeared as a character actor in around thirty five films between 1915 and 1945.

Selected filmography

 After Dark (1915)
 The Stolen Voice (1915)
 The Broken Law (1915)
 The Rail Rider (1916)
 The Eagle's Eye (1918)
 The Social Pirate (1919)
 Checkers (1919)
 The Greatest Love (1920)
 Timothy's Quest (1922)
 A Streak of Luck (1925)
 His People (1925)
 The Outsider (1926)
 Unknown Treasures (1926)
 Silken Shackles (1926)
 The Woman on Trial (1927)
 An Affair of the Follies (1927)
 The Play Girl (1928)
 For the Defense (1930)
 They Just Had to Get Married (1932)
 Before I Hang (1940)
 Kitty Foyle (1940)
 The Hard-Boiled Canary (1941)
 The Lady Eve (1941)
 Crossroads (1942)
 A Gentleman at Heart (1942)
 Too Many Women (1942)
 The Human Comedy (1943)
 The Heavenly Body (1944)
 The Lost Weekend (1945)

References

Bibliography
 Dietz, Dan. The Complete Book of 1910s Broadway Musicals. Rowman & Littlefield, 2021.
 Munden, Kenneth White. The American Film Institute Catalog of Motion Pictures Produced in the United States, Part 1. University of California Press, 1997.
 Rainey, Buck. Serials and Series: A World Filmography, 1912-1956. McFarland, 2015.

External links

1875 births
1956 deaths
American male film actors
American male stage actors
People from New York City